Investrust Bank Plc., commonly known as Investrust Bank, is a commercial bank in Zambia. It is licensed by the Bank of Zambia, the central bank and national banking regulator.

Location
The head office of the bank is in Ody's Building, along Great East Road, in Lusaka. The main branch of Investrust Bank Zambia Limited is located in Investrust House, at 4527 and 4527 Freedom Way, in the city of Lusaka, the largest city and capital of Zambia. The geographical coordinates of the bank's main branch are: 15°25'23.0"S, 28°16'46.0"E (Latitude:-15.423056; Longitude:28.279444).

Overview
, Investrust Bank was a medium-sized financial services provider in Zambia. It had under its control, assets totaling ZMW:1.284 billion (US$129.7 million), with shareholders' equity valued at ZMW:115.32 million (US$11.64 million).

History
The bank was founded in 1996, registering as a corporate entity, receiving a banking license and commencing banking operations during that year. In the beginning, the institution was privately held and was known as Investrust Merchant Bank Zambia Limited. In 2002, the bank's name was changed to Investrust Bank Limited. During 2004, the bank's stock was provisionally listed on the Lusaka Stock Exchange (LUSE) for the first time. In 2007 the bank's stock became fully listed on the LUSE.

Ownership
Investrust bank is a public company whose stock is publicly traded on the Lusaka Stock Exchange. The detailed shareholding in the bank was as depicted in the table below, as of 31 December 2016.

Branch Network
, the bank maintained a network of branches at the following locations:

 Head Office: Ody's Building, Great East Road, Lusaka
 Lusaka Main Branch: Investrust House, 4527/8 Freedom Way, Lusaka
 Savings Centre Branch: Investrust House, 4527/8 Freedom Way, Lusaka
 Kenneth Kaunda International Airport Agency: Lusaka International Airport, Lusaka
 Arcades Branch: Shop Number 32, Great East Road, Lusaka
 Mulungushi Branch: Mulungushi House, Ridgeway, Lusaka
 Industrial Branch: 13969 Chandwe Musonda Road, Lusaka
 Soweto Branch: Off of Los Angeles Road, Stand Number 67, New Soweto Market, Lusaka
 Kafue Road Branch: 14093 Kafue Road, Lusaka
 Manda Hill Branch: Manda Hill Shopping Centre, Corner of Great East Road & Manchinchi Road, Lusaka
 Levy Business Park Branch: Shop Number F06 & F08 Levy Business Park, Lusaka
 Mumbwa Road Branch: 284/132/34 Unit 5, Mumbwa Road, Lusaka
 Chililabombwe Branch: 72 Independence Avenue, Town Centre, Chililabombwe
 Chingola Branch: Civic Centre Building, Kabundi Road, Chingola
 Chipata Branch: 1783 Parenyatwa Road, Chipata
 Mwami Border Agency: Chipata
 Chirundu Branch: Units 39/40 & 51/52,  Clearing Agents Building, Chirundu OSBP, Chirundu Border Road, Chirundu
 Choma Branch: 398 Livingstone Road, Choma
 Copperbelt University Branch: Main Campus, Copperbelt University, Riverside, Kitwe
 Freedom Avenue Branch: Freedom Avenue, Kitwe
 Kabwe Branch: 1549 Kabwe Municipal, Revenue Hall, Freedom Way, Kabwe
 Kitwe Branch: 14 Obote Avenue, Kitwe
 Livingstone Branch: 103 Mosi-0-Tunya Road, Livingstone
 Nkumbula International Airport Agency: Harry Mwanga Nkumbula International Airport, Livingstone
 Luangwa Branch: Luangwa
 Lumwana Branch: Lumwana
 President Avenue Branch: 93902 Z–Mart Mall Building, President Avenue, Ndola
 Buteko Avenue Branch: Stand Number 3371, Ndola
 Solwezi Branch: 23/24 Independence Avenue, Solwezi
 Mongu Branch: 1868 Independence Road, Mongu.

Governance
Mr. Peter Banda, a non-executive board member is the Chairman of the Board of Directors. Simangolwa Shakalima serves as the Managing Director and Chief Executive Officer.

See also
 Bank of Zambia
 Economy of Zambia
 List of banks in Zambia

References

External links
 Website of Investrust Bank Plc
 Website of Bank of Zambia 
 Overview of Zambian Banking Sector

Banks of Zambia
Companies based in Lusaka
Banks established in 1996
1996 establishments in Zambia
Companies listed on Lusaka Stock Exchange